Ansell is a surname. Notable people with the surname include:

Alfred Ansell (18761941), New Zealand politician
Barbara Ansell (19232001), British physician
Barry Ansell (19472018), English footballer (Aston Villa)
Bryan Ansell (active from 1979), British war game designer
Cameron Ansell (born 1992), Canadian voice actor
 Caroline Ansell (born 1971), British Conservative Party politician
 Charles Ansell (painter) (born 1752), English painter
 Charles Ansell (17941881), British actuary
 David A. Ansell (born 1952), American physician and author
 Derek Ansell (active from 1999), British novelist and biographer
 George Ansell (19091988), English professional footballer
 George Frederick Ansell (18261880), English scientific inventor, chemist and assayer
 Gertrude Mary Ansell (18611932), British suffragette, animal welfare activist and businesswoman
Jack Ansell (1921–2008), English footballer
John Ansell (pirate) (died 1689), English buccaneer 
 John Ansell (18741948), English composer
 Jonathan Michael Ansell (born 1950), American insurance and digital marketing executive
 Jonathan Ansell (born 1982), English singer
 Mary Ansell (1861–1950), English actress and author
Mary Ansell (18801899), English murderer
Michael Ansell (19051994), British soldier, showjumper and showjumping administrator
Nick Ansell (born 1994), Australian football (soccer) player
Norah Ansell (19061990), English sculptor
Rodney Ansell (19541999), Australian bushman
Steven Ansell (born 1954), American violist
William Henry Ansell (18721959), British architect and engraver

See also 
 Colin King-Ansell (born 1947), New Zealand far-right politician